Melanostomias margaritifer is a species of fish from the Stomiidae family. The species occur in the Caribbean in the Northwest Atlantic.

References 

Stomiidae
Fish of the Atlantic Ocean
Fish of the Caribbean
Fish described in 1930